The year 1681 in music involved some significant events.

Events
Arcangelo Corelli is employed by the electoral prince of Bavaria.
Giovanni Legrenzi becomes assistant maestro di cappella at St Mark's, Venice.
Jean-Baptiste Lully is appointed court secretary to King Louis XIV of France.
Antonio Stradivari makes the Fleming violin.

Published popular music

Classical music
Heinrich Biber – 8 Violin Sonatas, C 138-145
Dietrich Buxtehude
 Afferte Domino gloriam honorem, BuxWV 2
 Gen Himmel zu dem Vater mein, BuxWV 32
 Kommst du Licht der Heiden, BuxWV 66
 Sicut Mose, BuxWV 97
 Ich habe Lust abzuscheiden, BuxWV 46
Giovanni Paolo Colonna
 Motetti sacri, Op. 2
 Motetti, Op.3
Arcangelo Corelli – Op. 1, 12 trio sonatas
Henry Dumont
Motets à II, III et IV parties pour voix et instruments avec la basse continue
Benedicite Deum cæli
Jubilate Deo
Johann Melchoir Gletle – Ave Maria (I and II)
Carlo Piazzi – Balletti, Op.2
Henry Purcell – Suite for Strings, Z.770
 Alessandro Stradella – Il Barcheggio

Opera
Domenico Freschi – Pompeo Magno in Cilicia
Jean-Baptiste Lully – Le Triomphe de l’Amour (ballet)
Agostino Steffani – Marco Aurelio
Marc Antonio Ziani – La Flora (composition begun by Antonio Sartorio, who died during composition)

Publications
Johann Wolfgang Franck – Geistliche Lieder (Compositions by Franck, Georg Böhm, and Peter Laurentius Wockenfuss)
Andreas Werckmeister – Orgel-Probe (the first appearance of the tuning system known as the Werckmeister temperament)

Births
January 20 – Francesco Bartolomeo Conti, composer (died 1732)
March 14 – Georg Philipp Telemann, composer (died 1767)
April 11 – Anne Danican Philidor, composer and concert organizer (died 1728) 
September 4 – Carl Heinrich Biber, composer (died 1749)
September 28 – Johann Mattheson, composer (died 1764)
December 14 – Giuseppe Valentini, violinist and composer (died 1753) 
date unknown – Giovanni Battista Reali, composer (died 1751)

Deaths
May 25 – Pedro Calderón de la Barca, librettist (born 1600)
June 27 – Ernst Christoph Homburg, librettist (born 1607)
July 8 – Georg Neumark, hymnist (born 1621)
October 22 – Benedetto Ferrari, composer (born c. 1603)
date unknown – Francesco Corbetta, guitarist and composer (born c.1615)
date unknown – Benedetto Ferrari, opera composer (born c.1603)

References

 
Music
17th century in music
Music by year